Children of the Atom is a comic book series written by Vita Ayala, and illustrated by Bernard Chang and Paco Medina and published by Marvel Comics. The title was launched in March 2021 as part of Reign of X, a relaunch of Marvel's X-Men related titles.

The series focuses on the teen vigilantes operating in New York City using alien technology and pretending to be mutants in order to join Krakoa.

Publication history 
Children of the Atom was originally announced in January 2020 for an April 2020 debut, but the series was delayed due to the onset of the COVID-19 pandemic. It was eventually announced to come out in January 2021 and later rescheduled for March 2021 debut. The series is part of the X-Men line's Reign of X, following the conclusion of X of Swords crossover.

It was advertised as the introduction of the teenage vigilantes as the X-Men's sidekicks. Writer Vita Ayala calls this series “the only human perspective book that we have in the X-line right now.” They also mentioned that the series is from the point of view of the teenagers who idolize the X-Men growing up and see and them as superheroes.

The characters made a cameo appearance in the story "Race" featured in Marvel's Voices #1.

Plot 
The Children of the Atom are teen vigilantes living in New York City dreaming of joining their heroes, the X-Men, on Krakoa. They stopped the depowered Hell's Belles during a robbery on one of their missions, earning praises from the X-Men while raising concerns from the Avengers as the teens are putting themselves in danger due to the Kamala's Law still in full effect.

During one of their attempts to use the gateway to enter Krakoa, they were captured by U-Men before being rescued by the X-Men. It is then revealed that the teens are non-mutants and are using alien technology to emulate their powers:

 Cyclops-Lass (Beatrice Bartholomew) – heat beam technology inside her visor.
 Cherub (Gabriel Brathwaite) – flight via exosuit and sonic blast from his hand harp.
 Gimmick (Carmen Maria Cruz) – absorption and manipulation of kinetic energy through her gauntlets.
 Marvel Guy (Benjamin Thomas) – chemically induced suggestions through pheromones released from his gloves.
 Daycrawler (Jason Thomas) – short-range teleportation field generator on his belt.
This development resulted in rejection from the X-Men, questioning their actions claiming themselves as mutant. However, the X-Men thanked them in their efforts of disbanding an anti-mutant hate group and locating three lost citizens. After receiving an invitation to the Hellfire Gala, Gimmick is revealed as the only mutant in the team. This revelation caused friction in the group and she left the team to go to Krakoa. She later helped and rejoined the team to stop the Hordeculture from stealing Krakoan flowers.

Cancelation 
Series writer Vita Ayala confirmed that Children of the Atom ended its run with issue #6, released in August 2021.

Reception 
At the review aggregator website Comic Book Roundup, the series received an average score of 7.8 out of 10 based on 64 reviews. AIPT reviewer Dan Spinelli stated that after a series of delays, the comic book is absolutely worth the wait bringing the young heroes to life with humor and the soap operatics the X-Men are known for. ComicBook.com reviewer Chase Magnett notes that the series failed to provide an effective focus for the characters and the conclusion is deeply unsatisfying as each page is spent on individual characters monologue on what they learned.

Prints

Collected editions

References

External links 
 Official site

X-Men titles
2021 comics debuts